The 1929 San Diego State Aztecs football team represented San Diego State Teachers College during the 1929 NCAA football season.

San Diego State competed in the Southern California Intercollegiate Athletic Conference (SCIAC). The 1929 San Diego State team was led by head coach Charles E. Peterson in his ninth season as football coach of the Aztecs. They played five home games at Balboa Stadium and one at Navy "Sports" Field. The Aztecs finished the season with three wins and five losses (3–5, 1–5 SCIAC). Overall, the team was outscored by its opponents 81–96 points for the season.

Schedule

Notes

References

San Diego State
San Diego State Aztecs football seasons
San Diego State Aztecs football